The Smolensk Upland is the Western part of the Smolensk–Moscow Upland at the East European Plain, which is located mainly in Smolensk Oblast of Russia, with small parts lying in Moscow and Kaluga Oblasts of Russia and in Vitebsk Region of Belarus.

The Smolensk Upland is divided between the drainage basins of the Volga (east) and the Dnieper (east). A number of big rivers have their sources in the upland. These include the Dnieper, the Desna, the Vazuza, and the Moskva.

References

Geography of Smolensk Oblast
Hills of Russia
Geography of Moscow Oblast
Geography of Vitebsk Region